Carlos Alberto Veiga Cabral (born 20 June 1952 in Lagos, Portugal) is a Portuguese former athlete who competed in middle-distance and cross country events. He won a silver medal in the 800 metres at the 1983 Ibero-American Championships. In addition, he represented his country at one outdoor and five indoor European Championships.

International competitions

Personal bests
Outdoor
800 metres – 1:47.33 (Berlin 1980)
1000 metres – 2:19.9 (Acoteias 1982)
1500 metres – 3:38.7 (Lisbon 1980)
2000 metres – 5:06.4 (Lisbon 1984)

Indoor
800 metres – 1:51.0 (Vienna 1979)
1500 metres – 3:39.9 (Sindelfingen 1980)

References

1952 births
Living people
People from Lagos, Portugal
Portuguese male middle-distance runners
Sportspeople from Faro District